Aninoasa is a commune in Gorj County, Oltenia, Romania. It is composed of five villages: Aninoasa, Bobaia, Costești, Groșerea and Sterpoaia.

Natives
 Ilie Văduva

References

Communes in Gorj County
Localities in Oltenia